Andrea Barlesi (born 15 June 1991, in Paris) is a Belgian-Italian racing driver, but runs with a Belgian racing license. He has won the 2010 Formula Le Mans season with DAMS. He was accompanied by Alessandro Cicognani and Gary Chalandon. In 2012, he is running one of SUNRED Engineering cars in World Touring Car Championship.

Early career
He has won the French Karting Championship a Europe Kart Championship twice (2007 and 2008). He won Belgium Karting Championship once (2007).
In 2009 he was third on the Clio Junior Cup Championship with 5 podiums.

Formula Le Mans
In 2010, Barlesi, joined the field with DAMS winning one race, Hungaroring. He eventually won the championships with only two points of difference.

Blancpain Endurance Series
In 2011, Barlesi did 4 rounds of the championship with Gulf Racing running with a Lamborghini Gallardo GT3 for GT3 Pro-Am category. He scored 6 points on the season finale at Silverstone alongside Frédéric Fatien.

Intercontinental Le Mans Cup
In 2011, Barlesi also did 4 rounds of the Intercontinental Le Mans Cup with OAK Racing. He was thirty first (fourth among the LMP2 entrants) on 12 Hours of Sebring and twenty fifth (seventh among LMP2 entrants) on Le Mans 24 Hours.

WTCC
In 2012, he joined SUNRED Engineering alongside Fernando Monje. Barlesi will run the #40 Seat Léon.

External links

1991 births
Living people
World Touring Car Championship drivers
Blancpain Endurance Series drivers
24 Hours of Spa drivers
Belgian racing drivers
OAK Racing drivers
DAMS drivers
Nürburgring 24 Hours drivers